Eli Eldo Cates (January 26, 1877 – May 29, 1964) was a Major League Baseball pitcher.

On August 10, 1902, Cates pitched a notable  minor league baseball no-hitter. On that date, the Nevada Lunatics and Jefferson City Convicts of the Class D Missouri Valley League played a game that resulted in a double no-hitter. Both Jefferson City's Jim Courtwright and Nevada's Eli Cates pitched no–hit games. Nevada won the game 1–0. A double no-hitter has happened just 10 times in baseball history, all at the minor league level.

References

External links
Baseball Reference.com page

1877 births
1964 deaths
Washington Senators (1901–1960) players
Baseball players from Indiana
Minor league baseball managers
Toledo Mud Hens players
Kansas City Blues (baseball) players
Shreveport Giants players
Minneapolis Millers (baseball) players
Des Moines Hawkeyes players
Rochester Bronchos players
Sedalia Goldbugs players
Leavenworth Orioles players
Portland Giants players
Oakland Oaks (baseball) players
Winona Pirates players
Des Moines Boosters players
Vancouver Beavers players
Indianapolis Hoosiers (minor league) players
Nevada Lunatics players